Charilam is one of the 60 Legislative Assembly constituencies of Tripura state in India. It is in Sipahijala district and is reserved for candidates belonging to the Scheduled Tribes. It forms part of the Tripura West (Lok Sabha constituency).

Members of Legislative Assembly 
 1967: A. Debbarma, Communist Party of India
 1972: Niranjan Deb, Communist Party of India (Marxist)
 1977: Harinath Debbarma, Tripura Upajati Juba Samiti
 1983: Parimal Chandra Saha, Indian National Congress
 1988: Matilal Saha, Indian National Congress
 1993: Ashok Debbarma, Indian National Congress
 1998: Narayan Rupini, Communist Party of India (Marxist)
 2003: Narayan Rupini, Communist Party of India (Marxist)
 2008: Narayan Rupini, Communist Party of India (Marxist)

Election results

2018 election

2013 election

See also
List of constituencies of the Tripura Legislative Assembly
Sipahijala district

References 

Assembly constituencies of Tripura
Sipahijala district